is a 1989 horizontally scrolling shooter arcade video game originally developed by Toaplan and published in Japan by Taito and North America by U.S.A. Games. The first horizontal shoot 'em up title to be created by Toaplan, the game takes place in the year 2998 where a space matter known as Black Nebula created by robot dictator Super Mech spreads and threatens to engulf human-controlled galaxies, as players assume the role of Space Federation member Captain Lancer taking control of the CNCS1 space fighter craft in a surprise attack to overthrow the enemies with the fighter craft's titular weapon.

Conceived by Tatsuya Uemura during his time working at Toaplan and developed in conjunction with Truxton, Hellfire served as an experiment to translate the company's shoot 'em up gameplay style in a horizontal format but faced a problematic development cycle and went through various changes before its eventual launch to the market. Initially launched for the arcades, the game was then ported to the Sega Genesis by NCS Corporation and published worldwide by Masaya, Seismic, Tectoy and Sega between 1990 and 1992, while a PC Engine Super CD-ROM² conversion by NEC Avenue was also published exclusively in Japan on 12 April 1991. Each version of the title features various additions and changes compared with the original release.

Hellfire was met with positive reception from video game magazines since its release in arcades, though some critics drew comparison with Irem's R-Type due to its gameplay style. The Genesis port was also met with positive response from reviewers, while the PC Engine Super CD-ROM² was received with similar response. Its engine would later be repurposed into Zero Wing. As of 2019, the rights to the title is owned by Tatsujin, a company founded in 2017 by former Toaplan member Masahiro Yuge and now-affiliate of Japanese arcade manufacturer exA-Arcadia alongside many other Toaplan IPs.

Gameplay 

Hellfire is a science fiction-themed horizontally scrolling shoot 'em up game, where players assume the role of Captain Lancer taking control of the CNCS1 space fighter craft through six increasingly difficult levels, each with a boss at the end that must be fought before progressing any further, in a surprise attack effort to overthrow Super Mech, his army and the Black Nebula space matter as the main objective. As far as horizontal scrolling shooters go, the title initially appears to be very standard, as players control their craft over a constantly scrolling background and the scenery never stops moving until the stage boss is reached.

A unique gameplay feature is the weapon system; players are equipped with four main weapons at the beginning that can be upgraded by picking up "P" icons and switch between them by pressing the change button, with each one shooting at a fixed direction no matter which way players move. Other items can also be picked up along the way such as speed increasers and "B" icons that grants a number of points, which are crucial for reaching high-scores to obtain extra lives. The Genesis version introduces the titular main weapon as a bomb capable of obliterating any enemy caught within its blast radius, as well as a shield and a satellite "option".

Depending on the settings in the arcade version, the title uses either a checkpoint system in which a downed single player will start off at the beginning of the checkpoint they managed to reach before dying, or a respawn system where their ship immediately starts at the location they died at. Getting hit by enemy fire or colliding against solid stage obstacles will result in losing a life, as well as a penalty of decreasing the ship's firepower and speed to his original state and once all lives are lost, the game is over unless the players insert more credits into the arcade machine to continue playing. Although there is an ending, the game loops back to the first stage after completing the last stage as with previous titles from Toaplan, with each one increasing the difficulty and enemies fire denser bullet patterns.

Plot 
The plot summary of Hellfire varies between each version. The story takes place in 2998, where humankind has reached a great point in intergalactic travel and space colonization with the help of a peaceful society, however a mysterious space matter known as Black Nebula appeared and begins engulfing different stars before reaching latest colonized galaxy by humans. It is eventually revealed that the force behind this matter is Super Mech, a mysterious robot dictator from the farthest regions of space with the only intention to destroy any resistance that it and its massive space armada faces. A Space Federation member, Captain Lancer, decides to initiate a surprise attack against Super Mech by piloting the only available space fighter craft, the CNCS1, loaded with Hellfire, the strongest weapon available in the galaxy. In the arcade and Genesis versions, Lancer returns safely to Earth after having defeated the Black Nebula, while the PC Engine Super CD-ROM² version features a more poignant ending where the character Kaoru takes her own life in a heroic act of self-sacrifice in order to save the Earth.

Development 

Hellfires creation was helmed by Tatsuya Uemura, former video game composer whose previous development works at Toaplan included Tiger-Heli, Flying Shark and Twin Cobra, becoming his first original project under the role of both producer and composer. Serving as their first horizontal shoot 'em up game, the project was developed in conjunction with Truxton as an experiment to translate Toaplan's vertical shoot 'em up gameplay in a Gradius-style format, however the team faced several issues during the development cycle due to lack of experience, among other factors.

Uemura and members of the team struggled with various aspects of designing a horizontal shoot 'em up title that proved to be frustrating for them like the terrain and collision detection, as their previous experience with vertical shoot 'em up did not carried over a horizontal format. Artist Kōetsu Iwabuchi, who previously worked on Twin Cobra, was responsible for the artwork, stating in a 1990 interview with Gamest that he had no limitation when creating the designs. Uemura also requested for the project to have a puzzle element to be integrated. Both the single-player and co-op versions were also created from the beginning of development due to pressure to make two-player games at the time. Despite the difficulties and changes during the creation process, the team managed to finish the project.

The Sega Genesis version of Hellfire was developed by most of the same staff from the original arcade release. In a 1990 interview with Japanese game magazine Beep! MegaDrive, designer Yuko Tataka stated that working with the Genesis proved to be equally difficult due to restrictions imposed by the hardware. The PC Engine Super CD-ROM² conversion was solely developed by NEC Avenue.

Release 

Hellfire was released in arcades across Japan and North America on October 1989 by Taito and U.S.A. Games, becoming one of first releases from Toaplan to prominently feature their name in public. On 25 June 1989, an album containing music from the title and other Toaplan games was published exclusively in Japan by Datam Polystar.

On 28 September 1990, Hellfire was ported to the Sega Genesis by NCS Corporation and first released in Japan by Masaya. It was then released in North America by Seismic on November of the same year, while Tectoy and Sega also distributed the title across Brazil and Europe respectively. Both the original arcade version and the later Genesis  port are similar but have a number of key differences between each other such as the latter having a smaller color palette and lower screen resolution that led to sprites being recolored and the graphics redrawn in different ways, an arranged soundtrack, new items, among other changes. The Genesis port was later re-released by independent publisher Retro-Bit in 2020.

On 12 April 1991, a version developed by NEC Avenue for the PC Engine Super CD-ROM² was released under the name Hellfire S, containing notable differences from the other versions, including a remixed, more orchestral soundtrack, animated cutscenes and the replacement of the leading male character Lancer with a female character called Kaoru (voiced by seiyū Yumi Tōma).

Reception 

In Japan, Game Machine listed Hellfire on their June 15, 1989 issue as being the fourteenth most-successful table arcade unit of the month, outperforming titles such as Wrestle War and Strider. Den of Geek noted it to be "a rare foray into the world of horizontally-scrolling shooters" for Toaplan. The Genesis version was well received. MegaTech magazine said it was "a slick and very good looking blaster which oozes playability". Mega placed the game at #4 in their Top Mega Drive Games of All Time.

Legacy 
After the initial release of Hellfire in arcades, Toaplan would go on to develop their second and last horizontal shoot 'em up project; Zero Wing, which was released during the same year and shared the same game engine. In more recent years, the rights to the game and many other IPs from Toaplan are now owned by Tatsujin, a company named after Truxton's Japanese title that was founded in 2017 by former Toaplan employee Masahiro Yuge, who are now affiliated with arcade manufacturer exA-Arcadia.

Notes

References

External links 

 Hellfire at GameFAQs
 Hellfire at Giant Bomb
 Hellfire at Killer List of Videogames
 Hellfire at MobyGames
 Hellfire at The Toaplan Museum
 Hellfire S at MobyGames

1989 video games
Arcade video games
Cooperative video games
Horizontally scrolling shooters
Masaya Games games
Multiplayer and single-player video games
Science fiction video games
Sega video games
Sega Genesis games
Shoot 'em ups
Taito games
Toaplan games
TurboGrafx-CD games
Video games developed in Japan
Video games featuring female protagonists
Video games scored by Masahiro Yuge
Video games scored by Tatsuya Uemura
Video games set in the 30th century
Video games set in the future
Taito arcade games